

General
A shape, drawing, depiction, or geometric configuration
Figure (wood), wood appearance
Figure (music), distinguished from musical motif
Noise figure, in telecommunication
Dance figure, an elementary dance pattern
A person's figure, human physical appearance

 Figure–ground (perception), the distinction between a visually perceived object and its surroundings 

 Figure, An entity from the Roblox game DOORS

Arts
Figurine, a miniature statuette representation of a creature
Action figure, a posable jointed solid plastic character figurine   
Figure painting, realistic representation, especially of the human form
Figure drawing
Model figure, a scale model of a creature

Writing
figure, in writing, a type of floating block (text, table, or graphic separate from the main text)
Figure of speech, also called a rhetorical figure
Christ figure, a type of character
 in typesetting, text figures and lining figures

Accounting
Figure, a synonym for number
Significant figures in a decimal number

Science
Figure of the Earth, the size and shape of the Earth in geodesy

Sports
Figure (horse), a stallion who became the foundation sire of the Morgan horse breed
Figure skating
Compulsory figures
Figure competition, a form of physique competition for women, related to bodybuilding
Beyer Speed Figure, a statistic in Thoroughbred racing

People
Figure (musician), stage name of American electronic musician Josh Gard
Vivian Davis Figures, Democratic member of the Alabama State Senate

See also
Figure 8 (disambiguation)